The Christian Revival Church (CRC) is Full Gospel in Faith, Evangelical in Practice (Ministry), Pentecostal in Movement & Charismatic in Worship (triune prayers: confession, resist/cast devils/demons and ask of blessing or oneness tongue praise & worship) and three times praise as Praise The Lord- before and after any prayers. And also perform fasting, healing and deliverance prayers.

The CRC movement was started from Gariphema Village, Nagaland, India on 9 January 1962 called Christian Revival Church Nagaland (NCRC). It spread to Arunachal Pradesh & began on 24.12.1987 at Naharlagun, Assam, Manipur, Meghalaya, Sikkim, West Bengal, Tamil Nadu, Maharashtra, Bihar, Uttarakhand, Odisha, Uttar Pradesh on 09.07.2017 at Chilkahar, Ballia and to other countries- Myanmar, Nepal, Thailand, Botswana, Namibia, China and South Africa.

This church believes in baptism by immersion, tithing for prosperity, speaking in other tongues as evidence of baptism in the Holy Spirit, casting out demons, fasting, divine healing, rapture of the church, and millennialism.

 Christian Revival Church Nagaland (1,195) 355,000
 Arunachal Pradesh Christian Revival Church Council
 Christian Revival Church Assam (ACRC)
 Christian Revival Church Manipur (Manipur CRC)
 Christian Revival Church Meghalaya (MCRC)
 Christian Revival Church Sikkim (SCRC)
 Christian Revival Church Tripura (TCRC)
 Christian Revival Church West Bengal (WBCRC)
 Christian Revival Church New Delhi
 Christian Revival Church Bihar
 Christian Revival Church Odisha
 Christian Revival Church Uttarakhand (UCRC)
 Uttar Pradesh Christian Revival Church (UPCRC)
 Christian Revival Church Tamil Nadu

See also
List of Christian denominations in North East India
Christianity in Arunachal Pradesh
Christianity in India

References

Christian denominations in India
1962 establishments in India
Protestant denominations established in the 20th century
Christian revivalists
Evangelical denominations in Asia